Joshua A. Evans (born January 16, 1971) is an American filmmaker, screenwriter, author and actor best known for his role in Born on the Fourth of July (1989).

Life and education
Evans was born in New York City to actress Ali MacGraw and producer Robert Evans. His father was of Russian-Jewish descent, and his maternal grandmother was of Hungarian-Jewish ancestry. His maternal grandfather was Irish. Evans is the nephew of the late producer Charles Evans, Sr., the stepson of actor Steve McQueen, and the stepbrother of actor and race car driver Chad McQueen. Evans grew up in Los Angeles and graduated in 1989 from the private Crossroads School in Santa Monica.

Career
He earned a Young Artist Awards in 1988. He went on to produce, direct, write and act. Most notably, he acted as Ron Kovic's hippie younger brother in Born on the Fourth of July, which won a 1990 Golden Globe Award, and John Lithgow's character's servile assistant in Ricochet.

The Daily Press'''s Kevin Thomas called Inside the Goldmine, in which Evans starred in 1994, a "meaningful look at a nihilist" and "the kind of film that could be made only by someone prepared to strive for self-knowledge."

He followed Inside the Goldmine by producing and directing the 35mm Glam, which a Los Angeles Times review called "an edgy tale of Hollywood innocence, corruption."

About Evans's third independent film, The Price of Air, a Los Angeles Times review pointed out that "Evans also stars, giving a persuasive portrayal as the naive but likable slacker, Paul... ." Variety wrote about the plot, in which the lead character agrees to courier a package of illicit drugs, "Conceptually, it’s an intriguing notion for a movie... ."

Evans also wrote, produced and directed the 2005 independent film Che Guevara starring Eduardo Noriega. The film screened at a 2006 conference sponsored by UCLA's Latin American Center's Working Group on Education and Culture.

In February 2014, filming in Las Vegas completed for Death in the Desert, a full-length movie directed and produced by Evans and starring Michael Madsen, Shayla Beesley and Paz de la Huerta. The score for a song performed by Evans' second wife, Saint, was done by Chris Goss. The film is based on the book Death in the Desert by Cathy Scott with the screenplay written by John Steppling. The film had its world premiere at the Tucson Film Festival,  on October 9, 2015, which was presented by the Arizona Underground Film Festival. Distribution was scheduled for 2016 by Osiris Entertainment.

Book
Evans wrote and published a novella titled Gold Star in April 2013.

Filmography

Actor
 Dream a Little Dream (1989) - Low Life #1
 Born on the Fourth of July (1989) - Tommy Kovic
 The Doors (1991) - Bill Siddons
 Ricochet (1991) - Kim
 Grey Knight (1993) - Lt. Regis
 Inside the Goldmine (1994) - Clyde Daye
 The Price of Air (2000) - Paul
 The Kid Stays in the Picture (2002) - Himself (archive footage)
 Thirty Nine (2016) - Adam

Director
 Inside the Goldmine (1994)
 Glam (1997)
 The Price of Air (2000)
 Che Guevara (2005)
 Everybody Dies (2009)
 Thirty Nine (2013)
 Death in the Desert (2015)

Writer
 Inside the Goldmine (1994)
 Glam (1997)
 The Price of Air (2000)
 Che Guevara (2005)
 Thirty Nine (2013)

Producer
 Glam (2001)
 Che Guevara (2005)
 Thirty Nine (2013)
 Death in the Desert (2014)

References

External links

 
TCMDb: Josh Evans
New York Times Josh Evans filmography
The New York Times film credits for Dorian Gray''
Daily Press film review, "'Goldmine': Meaningful Look at Nihilist," by Kevin Thomas, April 25, 1997

1971 births
20th-century American male actors
Male actors from California
American male film actors
Film producers from New York (state)
American male screenwriters
American people of Hungarian-Jewish descent
Living people
University of California, Los Angeles alumni
21st-century American male actors
Writers from New York City
Film directors from New York City
Film producers from California
Jewish American male actors
Jewish American screenwriters
Writers from Los Angeles
Film directors from Los Angeles
Screenwriters from New York (state)
Screenwriters from California
Evans family (Paramount Pictures)